The North West Division of the High Court of South Africa (previously named the Bophuthatswana Division and the North West High Court, and commonly known as the Mahikeng High Court) is a superior court of law with general jurisdiction over the western part of North West province of South Africa. (Eastern parts of the province fall within the jurisdiction of the Gauteng Division.) The division sits at Mahikeng.

History
In November 1977 a High Court was established at Mmabatho (now a suburb of Mahikeng) to take over the jurisdiction of the provincial divisions of the Supreme Court of South Africa in the bantustan of Bophuthatswana. A month later Bophuthatswana achieved nominal independence from South Africa and the High Court became the Supreme Court of Bophuthatswana. At first its decisions could be appealed to the Appellate Division of the Supreme Court of South Africa, but in 1982 a separate Appellate Division was established within the Bophuthatswana court.

When Bophuthatswana was reincorporated in South Africa on 27 April 1994, the court remained in existence, but three months later the Appellate Division was abolished and its jurisdiction transferred to the South African Appellate Division. When the final Constitution came into force in 1997 the remaining General Division of the Supreme Court of Bophuthatswana became one of the High Courts of South Africa. In 2001 the magisterial districts of Vryburg, Lichtenburg, Coligny, Zeerust, Groot Marico, Swartruggens, Koster, Rustenburg and Delareyville were added to its jurisdiction. It was known as the Bophuthatswana Division until 2009, when it was renamed the North West High Court by the Renaming of High Courts Act. In 2013, in the restructuring brought about by the Superior Courts Act, it became the North West Division of the High Court of South Africa.

References

External links
 Decisions of the North West Division

High Court of South Africa
High Court
Mahikeng
1977 establishments in South Africa
Courts and tribunals established in 1977